Emmanuele de Gregorio (18 December 1758 – 7 November 1839) was an Italian cardinal of the Roman Catholic Church and son of Leopoldo de Gregorio, Marquis of Esquilache.

Biography
De Gregorio was born at sea while his mother was travelling to Spain. Although he had one other cardinal among his relatives, no other information about his early life survives. However, by age 22 in 1780 he had become archpriest of the patriarchal Lateran basilica and in the following two decades became caught up in the controversy of the French Revolution, being imprisoned in 1798 and kept in captivity between 1811 and 1814. He was deputy vicar of Rome for long periods from 1795 to 1818 as the actual vicar, Cardinal Giulio Maria della Somaglia, was frequently absent. However, it is known that at one point the revolutionary government of France had planned to create him antipope in opposition to Pope Pius VI when he condemned the French Revolution in 1791.

In 1816, Pope Pius VII made De Gregorio a cardinal and in the following decade he rose to be one of the most powerful men in the Church. In both the 1829 and 1830 conclaves, he was considered one of the  leading papabili but had too many opponents to be elected Pope.

He died in Rome in 1839.

References

External links
 Brief biography

1758 births
1839 deaths
19th-century Italian cardinals
Cardinal-bishops of Frascati
Members of the Sacred Congregation of the Council
Major Penitentiaries of the Apostolic Penitentiary
Cardinals created by Pope Pius VII
People born at sea